Lotte Egging (born 8 June 1988) is a Dutch former cricketer who played as a right-arm medium-fast bowler. She appeared in one Test match, 12 One Day Internationals and two Twenty20 Internationals for the Netherlands between 2005 and 2008. She took a hat-trick in an ODI against Pakistan at the 2008 World Cup Qualifier.

References

External links
 
 

1988 births
Living people
Sportspeople from Nijmegen
Dutch women cricketers
Netherlands women One Day International cricketers
Netherlands women Test cricketers
Netherlands women Twenty20 International cricketers
Women's One Day International cricket hat-trick takers
Dutch expatriates in South Africa